Bourthes is a commune in the Pas-de-Calais department in the Hauts-de-France region in northern France.

Geography
A village situated some 15 miles (24 km) southeast of Boulogne-sur-Mer at the D128 and D131 crossroads. The source of the river Aa is found here.

Population

See also
Communes of the Pas-de-Calais department

References

Communes of Pas-de-Calais